Itame is a genus of moths in the family Geometridae.

Species
Itame messapiaria Sohn-Rethel, 1929
Itame sparsaria (Hübner, 1809)
Itame teknaria Powell & Rungs, 1942
Itame vincularia (Hübner, 1813)

Status unknown
Itame wanaria Linnaeus - See Macaria wauaria

References

External links

Natural History Museum Lepidoptera genus database

Macariini